Ambrose Rayappan (25 February 1901 – 24 November 1999) was the tenth and the first indigenous Archbishop of the Archdiocese of Pondicherry and Cuddalore. He was born at Dharapuram, Tamil Nadu. He was ordained as a priest for the Diocese of Coimbatore on 16 December 1923. He participated in the Second Vatican council as a Council Father.

On 8 January 1953 he was appointed auxiliary bishop of Pondicherry and Cuddalore, and was consecrated on 25 March 1953 by Auguste-Siméon Colas. He was appointed as coadjutor of the same archdiocese on 7 August 1953. When Mgr. Colas resigned, he succeeded him on 28 November 1955. He resigned his post on 17 March 1973. He was succeeded by Venmani S. Selvanather.

References

 

 

 

1901 births
1999 deaths
20th-century Roman Catholic archbishops in India
Roman Catholic archbishops of Pondicherry and Cuddalore
Participants in the Second Vatican Council